Shirinkenar (also Romanized as Shīrīnkenār) is a village in Rezvan Rural District, Jebalbarez District, Jiroft County, Kerman Province, Iran. 

According to the 2006 Iranian census, its population consisted of 45 inhabitants from 10 families.

References 

Populated places in Jiroft County